Lincoln County Sheriff's Office may refer to several sheriffs departments in the United States, including:

Lincoln County Sheriff's Office (Arkansas)
Lincoln County Sheriff's Office (Colorado), a law enforcement agency in Colorado
Lincoln County Sheriff's Office (Idaho), a law enforcement agency in Idaho
Lincoln County Sheriff's Office (Kansas), a law enforcement agency in Kansas
Lincoln County Sheriff's Office (Kentucky), a law enforcement agency in Kentucky
Lincoln County Sheriff's Office (Louisiana), a law enforcement agency in Louisiana
Lincoln County Sheriff's Office (Maine), a law enforcement agency in Maine
Lincoln County Sheriff's Office (Minnesota), a law enforcement agency in Minnesota
Lincoln County Sheriff's Office (Mississippi), a law enforcement agency in Mississippi
Lincoln County Sheriff's Office (Missouri), a law enforcement agency in Missouri
Lincoln County Sheriff's Office, a law enforcement agency in Montana
Lincoln County Sheriff's Office (Nebraska) 
Lincoln County, Nevada Sheriff's Office
Lincoln County, New Mexico Sheriff's Office
Lincoln County Sheriff's Office (Nevada), a law enforcement agency in Nevada
Lincoln County Sheriff's Office (New Mexico), a law enforcement agency in New Mexico
Lincoln County Sheriff's Office (North Carolina), a law enforcement agency in North Carolina
Lincoln County Sheriff's Office (Oklahoma), a law enforcement agency in Oklahoma
Lincoln County Sheriff's Office (Oregon), a law enforcement agency in Oregon
Lincoln County Sheriff's Office (South Dakota), a law enforcement agency in South Dakota
Lincoln County, Tennessee Sheriff's Office
Lincoln County Sheriff's Office (Washington), a law enforcement agency in Washington
Lincoln County Sheriff's Office (West Virginia), a law enforcement agency in West Virginia
Lincoln County Sheriff's Office, a law enforcement agency in Wisconsin
Lincoln County Sheriff's Office (Wyoming), a law enforcement agency in Wyoming

See also
Lincoln County (disambiguation)